Pyotr Fyodorovich Sokolov (1791, Moscow – , Merchik, Kharkov Governorate) was a Russian aquarelle portraitist who painted many of the most distinguished figures of the Pushkin era. He was the father of the painters Pyotr Sokolov, Pavel Sokolov and Alexander Sokolov.

Early life 
Sokolov was born in Moscow, and between the years of 1800 to 1809 he attended Imperial Academy of Arts where he studied with Alexei Yegorov and Vasily Shebuyev who both were very famous and respected artists. In 1809, Sokolov painted "Andromache Mourning Hector" ("Андромаха оплакивает убитого Гектора") for his institution's competition, receiving a minor gold medal as well as the title of "Artist". As part of the Academy's offerings, the students who won the major gold medal were also awarded a stipend to go abroad to enhance their education. Sokolov wanted to continue his education in Italy, so he stayed in school for one more year and participated in the contest again, but he did not manage to achieve this goal.

Career 
Sokolov captured numerous people in his portraits, starting with fellow artists and ending with veterans of the Patriotic War of 1812. Amongst those people individuals such as Alexander Pushkin and Vasily Zhukovsky, who were famous Russian poets, were included as well. Additionally, Sokolov received many commissions from various high-ranking persons. For example, the artist was invited by the imperial family to Anichkov Palace where he painted a portrait of Nicholas I of Russia's three-year-old son, Alexander, and the work was a success with the family.

Some of Sokolov's commissioners repeatedly requested works from him. One of the people who were painted three times was Ekaterina Pavlovna Bakunina. She was depicted in the years 1816, 1828 and 1834. In her first portrait which was done in pencil, she is depicted as a youthful lady. In the aquarelle work of 1828, Sokolov managed to convey the features that were socially desirable and attractive at that time in her portrait. As for the 1834 portrait, one can easily see how Sokolov depicted Bakunina (now Poltoratskaya) as a married woman.

Over the course of his life he created over 500 artworks, and not only are they found in private collections, since they are extremely valuable, but also in famous government museums such as State Russian Museum, State Tretyakov Gallery, and many others.

Technique
Sokolov was one of the first to employ a special watercolour technique where emulsion was not utilized, In addition to that, he was the person who has started the genre of the aquarelle portraiture in Russian art. From 1820 and onwards, he completely involved himself in perfecting his art form in which he succeeded. This technique in the years between 1820 and 1840 managed to replace the portrait miniatures that were popular in Russia prior to that. Even though Sokolov specialized in aquarelle painting, oftentimes he would use a graphite pencil in order to manage his initial draft, as well as an aid for special effects to enhance his artworks.

Works

References

External links

19th-century painters from the Russian Empire
Russian male painters
1791 births
1848 deaths
Russian portrait painters
Russian watercolorists
Artists from Moscow
Miniature painting
19th-century male artists from the Russian Empire